The Colonna Venus is a Roman marble copy of the lost Aphrodite of Cnidus sculpture by Praxiteles, conserved in the Museo Pio-Clementino as a part of the Vatican Museums' collections. It is now the best-known and perhaps most faithful Roman copy of Praxiteles's original.

The Colonna Venus is one of four marble Venuses presented in 1783 to Pope Pius VI by  Filippo Giuseppe Colonna; this, the best of them, was published in Ennio Quirino Visconti's catalogue of the Museo Pio-Clementino, where it was identified for the first time as a copy of the Cnidian Venus. Immediately it eclipsed the somewhat flaccid variant of the same model that, as the Belvedere Venus, had long been in the Vatican collections. During the 19th and early 20th centuries, a prudish tin drape was modestly wrapped around the legs of the Colonna statue this was removed in 1932, when the statue was removed to the Gabinetto delle Maschere where it can be seen today.

When Christian Blinkenberg wrote the first modern monograph of the Cnidian Aphrodite in 1933, he found the Colonna Aphrodite and the Belvedere Aphrodite to most accurately reflect the original, mediated through a Hellenistic copy.

Notes

References

Sources

Gallery

Sculptures of the Vatican Museums
Cnidian Venuses
Roman copies of 4th-century BC Greek sculptures